Piton is a French surname that may refer to the following notable people:
Alexandre Piton (born 1972), French ice dancer
Barbara Piton (born 1977), French ice dancer, sister of Alexandre
Bertrand Piton (born 1970), French football defender
Halina Pitoń (born 1972), Polish biathlete
John Piton (1865–1942), South African first-class cricketer
Lucas Piton (born 2000), Brazilian football player
Phil Piton (1903–1983), American baseball executive
Pierre de Piton, 16th century French colonel

See also
 

French-language surnames